Yanghe Township is a township under the administration of Zhuanglang County, Gansu, China. , it has 13 villages under its administration.

References 

Township-level divisions of Gansu
Zhuanglang County